Patrick G. Maggitti is the first provost of Villanova University. As Provost, Maggitti is the chief academic officer and oversees Villanova’s academic enterprise: six colleges and academic areas, including Graduate and Undergraduate Research, Falvey Memorial Library, the Honors Program, Enrollment Management, Decision Support and Data Integrity, and Strategic Planning and Institutional Effectiveness.

Early life and education
Maggitti was born and raised in Whitehall Township, Pennsylvania. He is the 5th of 6 children and attended Allentown Central Catholic High School.

He received a BS in Chemistry from Saint Joseph’s University and an MBA with honors from the Johns Hopkins University, and a PhD in strategic management from the University of Maryland in 2006.

Career
Prior to academia, Dr. Maggitti spent nearly 15 years in the steel and mining industries, where he founded two companies and held a variety of roles, including chief executive officer, director of national sales, and board member. He has also consulted with a variety of international organizations—including several Fortune 500 companies—on many facets of strategy and entrepreneurial thinking.

Maggitti previously served as the Helen and William O’Toole Dean of the Villanova School of Business. He has been a faculty member since 2008 and is also associate professor of Strategic Management and Entrepreneurship and the former Carmen and Sharon Danella Director of the Center for Innovation, Creativity, and Entrepreneurship (ICE Center) at the Villanova School of Business.

Maggitti has authored numerous publications for journals including Research Policy, Journal of Management Studies, and the Academy of Management Journal.

Maggitti’s research interests focus on dynamic processes, including strategy, innovation, entrepreneurship, and market- and non-market-based competition. His research is highly cited by other scholars, and a 2008 article he coauthored was identified by the Academy of Management as among the best papers for thought leadership in the field of entrepreneurship.

Publications
 Creativity Requires A Culture That Respects Effort And Failure; Maggitti, P.G. 2013.
 Top Management Attention to Innovation: The Role of Search Selection and Intensity in New Product Introductions; Qiang, Li; Maggitti, P.G.; Smith, Ken; Tesluk, Paul; Katila, Riitta 2012.
 TMT Potency and Strategic Decision-Making in HighTechnology Firms; Maggitti, P.G., Clark, K.D. 2012
 Market Watch: Information and Availability Cascades Among The Media And Investors In The U.S. IPO Market; Pollock, T.G., Rindova, V., Maggitti, P.G. 2008.
The Red Queen Effect: Competitive Action and Performance; Derfus, P.J., Maggitti, P.G., Grimm, C.M., Smith, K.G. 2008
Leadership in Hypercrisis: Leading in the Face of a Shaken Culture; Maggitti, P.G., Slay, H., Clark, K.D. 2010.
Administrative and Strategic Advantages of HRIS; Kovachs, K.A., Fagan, P., Maggitti, P.G. 2002.
Top Management Team Confidence; Clark, K.D., Maggitti, P.G. 2011.
Globalization and Corporate Partnering; Doh, J., Clark, K.D., Maggitti, P.G. 2008.
 Bisociation; Maggitti, P.G., Smith, K. G. 2005.
 Looking Back: Does Acquisition Experience Make or Break Future Deals?;Maggitti, P.G. 2002.

References

Year of birth missing (living people)
Living people
Allentown Central Catholic High School alumni
Saint Joseph's University alumni
Johns Hopkins University alumni
Villanova University people